New Discovery is an unincorporated community in Adams Township, Parke County, in the U.S. state of Indiana.

History
According to Ronald L. Baker, the community was so named by pioneers who had found fertile farmland near the original town site.

Geography

References

Unincorporated communities in Parke County, Indiana
Unincorporated communities in Indiana